The tit berrypecker (Oreocharis arfaki) is a species of bird in the family Paramythiidae. First described by Christian Erich Hermann von Meyer in 1875, it is monotypic within the genus Oreocharis. It is found in the New Guinea Highlands and more scarcely in northern parts of the island, in subtropical or tropical moist montane forests.

References

Tit berrypecker
Birds of New Guinea
Tit berrypecker
Taxonomy articles created by Polbot